"Golden Lady" is a song by the American musician Stevie Wonder, released in 1973 on his album Innervisions. While it was never released as a single, the album itself peaked at number 4 on the Billboard Top 200. The love song, written by Stevie Wonder, contrasts with the other songs on the record that comment upon societal issues within America. Examples include his comments on drug addiction within the song "Too High" and his political commentary on US President Richard Nixon in "He's Misstra Know-It-All".

This song is influenced by the montuno style due to the chord progression and syncopated rhythms found within its chorus.

Personnel
Stevie Wonder – lead vocal, piano,  Fender Rhodes, drums, Moog bass, T.O.N.T.O. synthesizer
Larry "Nastyee" Latimer – congas
Clarence Bell – Hammond organ
Ralph Hammer – acoustic guitar

Covers 
José Feliciano from the album And The Feeling’s Good released in 1974.
Kurt Elling from the album The Gate released in 2011.
Robert Glasper from his 1 Mic 1 Take covers released in 2013.
Bill Wurtz on his website under the Jazz section. Released in 2017.
Yesterday's New Quintet from the album Stevie released in 2004.

References

Stevie Wonder songs
1973 songs
Song recordings produced by Stevie Wonder
Songs written by Stevie Wonder